The National League East is one of Major League Baseball's six divisions. Along with the American League Central it is one of two divisions to have every member win at least one World Series title.

After having internal, informal divisions for scheduling purposes during the pre-expnsion era, the division was formally created when the National League (NL) (along with the American League) added two expansion teams and divided into two divisions, East and West effective for the 1969 season. The National League's geographical alignment was rather peculiar as its partitioning was really more north and south instead of east and west. Two teams in the Eastern Time Zone, the Atlanta Braves and the Cincinnati Reds, were in the same division as teams on the Pacific coast. This was due to the demands of the Chicago Cubs and St. Louis Cardinals, who refused to support expansion unless they were promised they would be kept together in the newly created East division.

During the two-division era, from 1969 to 1993, the Philadelphia Phillies and the Pittsburgh Pirates together owned more than half of the division titles, having won a combined 15 of 25 championships during that span. They were also the only teams in the division to have won consecutive titles during that span.

When the National League realigned into three divisions in 1994, the Pittsburgh Pirates were originally supposed to stay in the East while the Braves were to be moved to the newly created National League Central. However, the Braves, wanting to form a natural rivalry with the expansion Florida Marlins, elected to be placed in the East. Despite the Marlins offering to go to the Central, the Pirates instead gave up their spot in the East to the Braves. Since then, the Pirates have tried several times unsuccessfully to be placed back in the East.

Division membership

Current members
New York Mets – Founding member
Philadelphia Phillies – Founding member
Washington Nationals – Founding member (originally as the Montreal Expos in 1969)

Former members
Chicago Cubs – Founding member, moved to the NL Central in 1994.
Pittsburgh Pirates – Founding member, moved to the NL Central in 1994.
St. Louis Cardinals – Founding member, moved to the NL Central in 1994.

Division members
Place cursor over year for division champ or World Series team.

 The creation of the division with the expansion of the league – with the Expos added.
 Florida Marlins added in the 1993 expansion
 The Atlanta Braves moved in from the NL West, and  the Chicago Cubs, Pittsburgh Pirates, and St. Louis Cardinals moved into newly created National League Central Division
 The Montreal Expos relocated to Washington, D.C., becoming the Washington Nationals
 The Florida Marlins relocated from Miami Gardens, Florida to Miami and changed their name to the Miami Marlins

Champions by year
Team names link to the season in which each team played

† – Due to the 1981 Major League Baseball strike, the season was split. Montreal won the second half and defeated first-half champion Philadelphia (59–48) in the postseason.
§ – Due to the 1994–95 Major League Baseball strike starting August 12, no official winner was awarded. Montreal was leading at the strike.
†† – Due to the COVID-19 pandemic, the season was shortened to 60 games. By virtue of the eight-team postseason format used for that season, division runner-up Miami (30–29, .508) also qualified for the playoffs.
††† – The Braves and Mets finished tied for first place with identical records. The Braves were declared division winners, due to having won the season series against the Mets, and the Mets received the wild card berth.

Most Division titles

Italics indicate teams no longer in the division.
Note that because of the wild card postseason berth, the Miami Marlins have two World Series wins (1997, 2003) without ever winning the division.

Other postseason teams

* – Defeated the Cincinnati Reds in a one-game playoff for the Wild Card, 5–0.

** –  From 2012 to 2019, and in 2021, the Wild Card was expanded to two teams. Those teams faced each other in the Wild Card Game to determine the final participant in the National League Division Series. In 2020 only, eight teams, including the three division winners, played in a best-of-three Wild Card Series, with the winners advancing to the Division Series. Starting in 2022, the Wild Card field was increased to three teams, and along with the lowest-ranked division winner, qualified for the Wild Card Series to determine the remaining two slots in the Division Series.

††† – The Braves and Mets finished tied for first place with identical records. The Braves were declared division winners, due to having won the season series against the Mets, and the Mets received the wild card berth.

Season results

Notes and Tiebreakers
 New York and Cincinnati of the National League Central were tied for the wild-card berth and played in a tie-breaker game. The Mets won 5–0 to claim the wild-card spot.
 Atlanta and St. Louis of the National League Central were tied for the second and third seed but the Braves were relegated to the third seed by losing the season series 4–3.
 New York and San Francisco of the National League West were tied for both wild-card berths, but the Mets claimed the first wild-card spot by winning the season series 4–3.
 Atlanta and New York were tied for the division title, but the Braves claimed the National League East title by winning the season series 10–9.

See also
National League Central
National League West
American League East
American League Central
American League West

References

MLB Final Standings By Year

Major League Baseball divisions
1969 establishments in the United States